The Sky VIP Official Big Top 40 from Global is a radio chart show broadcast every Sunday from 4 to 7pm on Global's Capital and Heart networks, presented by Will Manning. It was started in May 2009 but the show is the descendant of The Network Chart Show, which started in September 1984 and had been broadcast on 140 commercial radio stations in the UK, having been re-branded several times over the years.

Format
The Sky VIP Official Big Top 40 from Global begins with a recap of the previous week's Top 5 (sometimes 6) songs, followed by a countdown of the 40 biggest songs from the last seven days. A recap is broadcast after every ten songs, apart from the top 10 which they recap after every 9 songs. Interviews with the artists making that particular week's chart, competitions, calls with listeners and advertisements make up the remaining airtime. The Number 1 song is announced just before 7pm.

The chart is compiled based on iTunes Music downloads, Apple Music Streaming, and radio airplay from the stations that broadcast the show. It is the only UK chart which includes radio airplay, much like the Billboard Hot 100 in the US. The algorithm differs to that of the Official UK Singles Chart, which includes physical sales, as well as downloads and streaming from all sourcesbut does not take radio airplay into account.

Will Manning is the programme's current host. He started on the show in January 2019. The show is produced by Luke Prior and broadcast from Global's studios in Leicester Square, London.

The whole top 40 chart gets published on bigtop40.com after the show for fans to read.

History

The show began on 30 September 1984 as The Network Chart Show. It was originally presented by David Jensen (known then as 'Kid Jensen') and was unique in that it was a cross-industry show, broadcast on competing commercial radio stations across the UK. The Network Chart Show aired on Sundays from 5 to 7pm, as competition to BBC Radio 1's own Top 40 chart show, The Official Chart. In October 1990, the show was extended to start at 4pm and the chart expanded from a Top 30 to a Top 40 countdown.

The Network Chart Show had been compiled by MRIB until Pepsi took over sponsorship from Nescafé in August 1993. In 1995, it was called the Pepsi Network Chart Show, but in 1996 it was renamed the Pepsi Chart. The show became Hit40UK on 5 January 2003.

It was relaunched as The Big Top 40 Show on 14 June 2009. Between 2010 and 2018, the programme was sponsored by Vodafone, becoming The Vodafone Freebees Big Top 40 (later The Vodafone Big Top 40 and The Official Vodafone Big Top 40). For the first time, listeners could change the chart during the show by downloading tracks on iTunes. Songs 40 to 11 were played before the new Top 10 was finalised at 6:10pm, with iTunes sales from during the show taken into account. This made it the first real-time chart show broadcast on UK radio.

In September 2018, Bauer announced that their Hits Radio Network would stop carrying the show after the expiration of its contract at the end of 2018. Global, which produced the show, made the decision to withdraw the programme from syndication to the wider commercial radio network. The final show across the commercial radio network aired on 30 December 2018. The new show, The Official Big Top 40, was launched in January 2019 and is widely available on Capital and Heart.

In March 2022, the show gained a new sponsor and was renamed The Sky VIP Official Big Top 40.

Presenters
Current presenter: Will Manning (2019–present)
Cover presenter: Pandora Christie (2021, 2022—present)

Previous presenters
Marvin Humes (2014–2018)
Kat Shoob (2009–2018)
Rich Clarke (2009–2013)
Matt Wilkinson (cover, 2009–2018)
Greg Burns (cover, 2014–2016)
James Bassam (cover, 2017–2019)
Sian Welby (cover, 2019)
 Dev Griffin (cover, 2021-2022)

Previous producers
Paul Phelps
Richard Steel
Greg Hughes
Paddy Bunce

Radio stations
List of radio stations that broadcast The Sky VIP Official Big Top 40.

National
Capital UK
Heart UK

Scotland
Capital Scotland
Heart Scotland

Wales
Capital Cymru
Capital North West and North Wales
Capital South Wales
Heart North and Mid Wales
Heart South Wales

East Midlands
Capital Midlands

East of England
Heart East
Heart Hertfordshire

Greater London
Capital London
Heart London

North East England
Capital North East
Heart North East

North West England
Capital Liverpool
Capital Manchester and Lancashire
Capital North West and North Wales
Heart North West

South East England
Capital South
Heart South

South West England
Heart West

West Midlands
Capital Mid-Counties
Capital Midlands
Heart West Midlands

Yorkshire and the Humber
Capital Yorkshire
Heart Yorkshire

List of non-Global radio stations that also broadcast the show in 2018.

National
The Hits

Scotland
Central FM
Clyde 1
Forth 1
MFR
Northsound 1
Radio Borders
Tay FM
Two Lochs Radio
West FM

East of England
KL.FM 96.7
Radio Essex

Yorkshire and the Humber
Dearne FM
Hallam FM
Lincs FM
Radio Aire
Ridings FM
Rother FM
Pulse 1
Trax FM
Viking FM

West Midlands
Free Radio (Birmingham)
Free Radio (Coventry & Warwickshire)
Free Radio (Herefordshire & Worcestershire)
Free Radio (Shropshire & Black Country)
Rugby FM
Signal 1
Touch FM (Burton, Lichfield and Tamworth)
Touch FM (Coventry)
Touch FM (Stratford-upon-Avon)
Touch FM (Warwick)

North East England
Metro Radio
TFM
Sun FM

North West England
CFM
Key 103
Radio City
Radio Wave 96.5
Rock FM
The Bay
Tower FM
Wire FM
Wish FM

South East England
Banbury Sound
Eagle Radio
Spirit FM

South West England
Pirate FM
Spire FM

East Midlands
Amber Sound FM
Connect FM
Gem
Peak FM
Rutland Radio

Wales
Bridge FM
Nation Radio
Radio Carmarthenshire
Radio Ceredigion
Radio Pembrokeshire
The Wave

Northern Ireland
Cool FM

Records and statistics
The current song at Number 1 is Miracle (Calvin Harris and Ellie Goulding song) by Calvin Harris & Ellie Goulding.

The song holding the record for most weeks at Number 1 is "Despacito (remix)" by Luis Fonsi, Daddy Yankee and Justin Bieber with 11 non-consecutive weeks.

The longest running song on the Big Top 40 is "Blinding Lights" by The Weeknd (129 non-consecutive weeks).

The song that has spent the most consecutive weeks at Number 1 is "These Days" by Rudimental, Jess Glynne, Macklemore and Dan Caplen with nine consecutive weeks (4 February - 1 April 2018).

The artist with the most Number 1 songs is Ed Sheeran with 19 singles to date. 

The group with the most Number 1 songs is Little Mix with 8 songs to date.

References

External links

British music radio programmes
British record charts
Music chart shows
Capital (radio network)
Vodafone